The Axedale railway station was a railway station on the former Heathcote railway line in Victoria, servicing the town of Axedale.

The station opened with the railway line in October 1888. The station site had been severely criticised for its distance from both Axedale township and Axedale Racecourse, with unsuccessful calls to re-site the station closer to the town. It faced further calls to relocate the station in 1890, following the opening of a picnic siding closer to Axedale than the station.

During its first month of operation, more than a thousand tons of goods passed through the station. However, by 1901, the Acting Commissioner of Railways cabled that the passenger traffic at Axedale was "not sufficient to justify any expenditure on the station buildings". Despite this, the Shire of Strathfieldsaye council continued to lobby for better passenger facilities and the construction of cattle pits at the station.

In 1907, the station won a prize as "the most picturesque station in its section". A telegraph office at the station opened  1910 and closed  1917. The council's lobbying would eventually result in the station gates being replaced with cattle grids in 1912. A siding opened near the station in the late 1920s to service a new municipal quarry.

Passenger services to the station ceased along with those on the rest of the line in December 1941, with the line closed to all traffic in December 1958. Most of a significant 610m-long timber bridge over the Campaspe River at Axedale was demolished in 1972, though a small section survives on private property.

The Bendigo-Kilmore Rail Trail now passes through the station site. A historic railway wagon was placed at the site as a static display in 2018 by the Friends of the Bendigo-Kilmore Rail Trail.

References

Railway stations closed in 1941
Disused railway stations in Victoria (Australia)